Middlefield Collegiate Institute (MCI) is a semestered, public high school in the neighbourhood of East Milliken in the city of Markham, Ontario, Canada. It is part of the York Region District School Board. It is located in southeast Markham, bordered by the major arteries McCowan Road to the west, Steeles Avenue to the south, Markham Road to the east and 14th Avenue to the North.

History

In 2009, Middlefield had its first major expansion, building a tech wing with six new classrooms in the Southern Wing. It houses the Auto, Construction, Hairstyling tech classes, and some Applied English classes and Communication Tech classes. 

In 2013, factors such as a large exiting class and small entering class caused a surplus in teachers, resulting in 17 of them being moved across the board to other schools.

Programs

MCI has the widest array of Tech courses in South-east York Region. MCI offers Automotive Technology, Transportation Technology, Construction Technology, Design Technology, Computer Technology, Hairstyling and Aesthetic Technology, Communication Technology, Information Technology, Business Technology and Wood Shop. Other than that, the school also provides;
Alternative Education Program
English as a Second Language Program
Specialist High Skills Major in Transportation Technology and Health and Wellness
Special Education Programs
Co-op Education Program
MCI stopped offering Advanced Placement courses in 2016, which had been offered in Science, Math and Technology.

Athletics

Athletic Council
Middlefield Athletic Council (MAC) coordinates and funds athletic events such as the athletic banquet. This club allows the students to realize the importance of physical education by promoting healthy living through school events, with the help of the student council.

Teams and sports clubs

Badminton - Junior/Senior
Baseball - Varsity Boys
Basketball - Junior/Senior Boys & Junior/Senior Girls
Cross Country - Varsity
Cricket - Varsity Boys
Field Hockey - Varsity Girls
Rock Climbing - Varsity
Soccer - Junior/Senior Boys & Junior/Senior Girls
Slo-pitch - Varsity Girls
Track and Field - Varsity
Ultimate Frisbee - Varsity Coed
Volleyball - Junior/Senior Boys & Junior/Senior Girls

Middlefield was the only York Region school to win the soccer championship two years in a row, which started with the junior boys of 2003-2004.

Middlefield's Senior and Junior Boys Basketball teams both won the 2015 York Region Athletic Association Tier 2 Basketball championship.

Intramural sports
In addition to competitive sports teams, Middlefield students have the opportunity to participate in in-school sporting events such as:

Middlefield Intramural Hockey Association (MIHA)
Middlefield's Basketball Association (MBA)
Middlefield's Iron Person

Mock Trial Team

The Middlefield Mock Trial Team, led by Law teachers Mr. Glass and Ms. Mobilos and Mr. Draycott, have been the most successful team from this school. Over the past twelve years, it has made the Elite 8 in Ontario each time, including four silver medals, the last coming in the 2010-2011 year. Middlefield Collegiate Institute is one of the few public high schools which have made it this far in the championship and is the most successful mock trial team from a public high school in Ontario. Middlefield again made the Elite 8 in 2013, winning the GTA South Regionals. Middlefield followed this up by winning the Ontario Bar Association Mock Trial Tournament and becoming Provincial Champions for the first time, defeating Cawthra Park Secondary School.

Facilities

MCI has a large glass ceiling in the rotunda, which is renovated biennially, to check for possible hazards and risks, and to replace any cracked or possible dangerous glass. This glass ceiling can be seen from almost anywhere in the central section of the school, and is a staple of Middlefield culture. The ceiling also gives in light and provides it for the central wing as well, thus helping reduce MCI's environmental impact, and is one of the reasons MCI was certified a Silver Eco School.

MCI is atrium shaped, and from the first floor of the rotunda, can look up and see the third floor. There is also a glass elevator which provides travel between the three floors, but can only be used by staff or students who have disabilities.

As the local community continued to grow, MCI required an extension of the building to accommodate for the growing student body. In June 2008, construction began to create an extended west wing to the school. The wing is only one storey high, and consists of a hairstyling classroom, construction classroom, garage, two washrooms, and an emergency exit.
Anime club 
Art Labs
Wood Shop
Cafeteria
Communication Technological Labs
Family Studies Labs
SAC Office
Drama Stage
Gymnasiums
Food Lab
Guidance Office
Outdoor - Baseball Diamond, Soccer Fields, Running Track
Music Room
Weight Room
Photography Dark Room
Library
Hairstyling
Auto Shop
Rock Climbing Wall

Academics
Middlefield Collegiate is ranked 8 of 676 Ontario high schools on the 2014–2015 Fraser Institute school report, with an overall rating of 9.1 out of 10. The percentage of eligible students who passed their Ontario Secondary School Literacy Test on the first attempt was 93.6%.

Principals
Ken Cluely 1992-1995
Jim Gilliland 1995-1998
Cecil Roach 1998-2002
Gary Micheal 2002-2004
Tony Lewis 2005-2008
Annette Oliver 2008-2012
Peter Tse 2012-2014
Janani Pathy 2014-2017
Aline Daniel 2017-2022
Arlene Higgins-Wright 2022-Present

Feeder schools
The following elementary schools are part of the Middlefield Collegiate Institute family of schools. Every year, the Guidance Department visits each of these schools to talk to the Grade 8's about courses and enrollment:
 Markham Gateway Public School
 Armadale Public School
 Ellen Fairclough Public School
 Coppard Glen Public School
 Parkland Public School
 Cedarwood Public School

Notable staff
 Marina Cohen (1994-1995), Canadian children's author; "Ghost Ride" (former English Teacher)
 Michael Morin (2000-Current), winner of the Ontario Association for Mathematics Education Exceptional and Creative Teaching Award (Current Mathematics Teacher) 
 Julia Munro (1992-1994), Member of Provincial Parliament for York-Simcoe and former Cabinet Minister. (Former History Teacher) 
 Sophie Patras (2003-present), former producer and scriptwriter for the CBC, Canada A People's History (current English teacher)
 Cecil Roach (1995-2002), YRDSB Superintendent of Schools (former English teacher, then Principal)
 Roozbeh Termei (2008-2014), former film and dramatic short actor (former Mathematics teacher)

Notable alumni
Justin Peroff, drummer in Canadian band Broken Social Scene, event promoter, artist manager and developing producer
Justyn Warner, Canadian Olympian and Canadian 100m Record Holder, 3rd place 2012 Summer Olympics, earned Bronze at World Championships in Athletics
Stephen Weiss, Hockey player with the Florida Panthers and Detroit Red Wings

See also
List of high schools in Ontario

References

External links

Official website
Middlefield Profile on York Region Website

York Region District School Board
High schools in the Regional Municipality of York
Buildings and structures in Markham, Ontario
Educational institutions established in 1992
1992 establishments in Ontario